Lu Bin (陆斌) (born 19 May 1987 in Suzhou, Jiangsu) is a Chinese sprinter who specializes in the 100 metres.

Lu represented China at the 2008 Summer Olympics in Beijing. He competed at the 4x100 metres relay together with Hu Kai, Zhang Peimeng and Wen Yongyi. In their qualification heat they placed fourth behind Jamaica, Canada and Germany. Their time of 39.13 was the eighth-fastest out of sixteen participating nations in the first round and they qualified for the final. There they were, however, disqualified and placed at the eighth position.

References
Team China 2008

1987 births
Living people
Athletes (track and field) at the 2008 Summer Olympics
Chinese male sprinters
Olympic athletes of China
Sportspeople from Suzhou
Asian Games medalists in athletics (track and field)
Athletes from Jiangsu
Athletes (track and field) at the 2010 Asian Games
Asian Games gold medalists for China
Medalists at the 2010 Asian Games
Runners from Jiangsu
20th-century Chinese people
21st-century Chinese people